Quillarumi (possibly from Quechua killa moon, rumi stone) is an archaeological site with rock paintings located west of the town of Huánuco, Peru.

References 

Archaeological sites in Huánuco Region
Archaeological sites in Peru
Rock art in South America
Mountains of Peru
Mountains of Huánuco Region